Ziendi is a village in Sangha-Mbaéré in the Central African Republic. It is 209 miles (337 km) west of Bangui and 290 miles (467 km) north west of Mbandaka.

sources
http://www.geographic.org/geographic_names/name.php?uni=-1946448&fid=1453&c=central_african_republic

Populated places in Sangha-Mbaéré